The French hood is a type of woman's headgear that was popular in Western Europe in the 16th century.

The French hood is characterized by a rounded shape, contrasted with the angular "English" or gable hood. It is worn over a coif, and has a black veil attached to the back, which fully covers the hair. Unlike the more conservative gable hood, it displays the front part of the hair.

History
The origins of the French hood can be seen in portraits of Anne of Brittany in the early 1500s. Although popularly associated with Anne Boleyn, it was probably introduced to the English court by Mary Tudor, Queen of France, who is depicted wearing one in a wedding portrait from around 1516. However, English women at the time mostly wore the gable hood, and so it did not achieve much popularity in England until the 1530s and 1540s. Most examples from this period can be seen in depictions of women who were in service to one of Henry VIII's wives, implying that it was primarily a court fashion.

In September 1537, Lady Lisle, a Tudor noblewoman whose correspondence is widely documented, requested from the merchant William le Gras: "many hats, such as the ladies wear in France, for now the ladies here follow the French fashion." Despite its growth in popularity, the then-Queen Jane Seymour apparently forbade her ladies from wearing the French hood. John Husee informed Lady Lisle that her daughter, an attendant to the Queen, was required to instead wear a "bonnet and frontlet of velvet", lamenting that it "became her nothing so well as the French hood."

In the early 1540s, Henry VIII passed a sumptuary law restricting the usage of "any Frenche hood or bonnet of velvett with any habiliment, paste, or egg [edge] of gold, pearl, or stone" to the wives of men with at least one horse. As the century progressed, the French hood became smaller and more curved, and was worn further back on the head.

The inventories of the jewels of Mary, Queen of Scots, include several pairs of jewelled "billaments" worn at the front of a hood (see below). They were described using a French word, bordure.

Construction
The various elements of the French hood are as follows:
Coif – Made of linen, tied under the chin or possibly secured to the hair with pins, the coif was almost always white from the first quarter of the 16th century onward, with a fashion for early French hoods having red coifs existing prior to 1520.
Crepine – A pleated or gathered head covering made from fine linen or silk, the crepine was sometimes worn without a coif, and may have been the origin of the pleated frill seen at the edge of the coif. The crepine could also possibly have been the bag-like attachment seen at the back of early French hoods, worn without a veil.
Paste – Worn over the coif/crepine. More than one in a contrasting color could be worn at a time, possibly derives its name from the paste used to stiffen it, or from the term 'passé' meaning "border", derived from the effect of a border of contrasting color on the French hood.
Veil – The "hood" portion, almost always black. Could be made from wool, or silk velvet or satin. It hung in a "straight fall" fashion and covered the back hair completely.
Billaments – Sometimes referred to as "upper" and "lower" billaments, these formed the decorative border along the upper edge of the hood and the front edge of the coif or paste. Wardrobe accounts of velvet and satin for the making of billaments may refer to the base upon which the goldwork, jewels, and pearling was attached.
Cornet/Bongrace/Shadow – A visor-like accessory that shaded the wearer's eyes. Later in the century, when the veil of the hood was flipped up on top of the wearer's head and pinned in place to shade the eyes, this was also apparently termed a "bongrace" or "shadow", as it protected the face from the sun.

As there are no known extant French hoods in existence, the precise details of its construction remain a mystery. It is often interpreted as featuring a stiff, protruding crescent,
but statues from the period indicate it laid flat on the wearer's head.

Gallery

See also
 1500–1550 in fashion
 1550–1600 in fashion
 Kokoshnik

References

Further reading
Arnold, Janet: "Queen Elizabeth's Wardrobe Unlock'd", W. S. Maney and Son Ltd., 2001. , .
Ashelford, Jane: The Art of Dress: Clothing and Society 1500–1914, Abrams, 1996. . 
Ashelford, Jane. The Visual History of Costume: The Sixteenth Century. 1983 edition, 1994 reprint.

External links

French Hood Images
French hood research
Tudor and Elizabethan Coifs

French clothing
Hats
16th-century fashion